Annaiyin Aanai is a 1958 Indian Tamil-language drama film directed by Ch. Narayana Murthy, starring Sivaji Ganesan and Savitri. The film was released on 4 July 1958, and won the National Film Award for Best Feature Film in Tamil.

Plot

Cast 
Sivaji Ganesan as Shankar and Ganesh
Savithri as Prema
M. N. Nambiar as Balu
S. V. Ranga Rao as Parobakaram
V. R. Rajagopal as Sundari's brother
M. R. Santhanam as Karunakaran
O. A. K. Thevar as Public prosecutor
K. V. Srinivasan as the Buddhist monk
M. N. Rajam as Sundari
M. Pandari Bai as Gowri
T. P. Muthulakshmi as Ganesh's servant

Production 
Annaiyin Aanai was produced by A. M. M. Issmayil under Paragon Pictures. Ch. Narayana Murthy directed the film besides writing the story and screenplay, while Murasoli Maran wrote the dialogues. C. Raghavan was the art director, M. A. Perumal was the editor, B. Hiralal was the choreographer, and J. G. Vijayam was the cinematographer. One scene in the film required Savitri's character to become emotional, grab Ganesan's character by the shirt and shake him excessively. Savitri tore Ganesan's shirt and clawed his chest, resulting in him bleeding heavily. Afterwards when he pretended to hit her with a towel, she controlled her emotions and stopped.

Soundtrack 
The music composed by S. M. Subbaiah Naidu. Lyrics by A. Maruthakasi, Ku. Ma. Balasubramaniam, Ka. Mu. Sheriff, K. S. Gopalakrishnan and Va. Somanathan. The song "Neeyegadhi Eswari" is set in Charukesi raga.

Accolades 
At the 6th National Film Awards, Annaiyin Aanai won the National Film Award for Best Feature Film in Tamil – Certificate of Merit.

References

External links 

1950s Tamil-language films
1958 films
Films directed by Chitrapu Narayana Rao
Films scored by S. M. Subbaiah Naidu